HMS Assistance was an Arctic discovery barque of the Royal Navy, and the sixth vessel to carry the name. She began in 1834 as the India-built merchant vessel Acorn. Her name was changed to Baboo. Under that name she transported contract labourers between Mauritius and India, and immigrants to South Australia. The Royal Navy purchased her in 1850 and named her HMS Assistance. Assistance participated in two Arctic expeditions before her crew abandoned her in the ice in 1854.

Career

Merchant Navy 
Assistance was built out of teak in 1835, at Howrah, Calcutta, and was launched as the merchant vessel Acorn. She was renamed Baboo at some point prior to 1837.

On 23 August 1837, Baboo carried 106 male and six female contract labourers from Calcutta to Mauritius. She also made one voyage repatriating contract labourers from Mauritius to India. She had embarked 240 contract labourers, of whom six men died on the way to Madras, and eleven between Madras and Calcutta.

Baboo first appeared in Lloyd's Register in 1839 with Forrester, master, T. Kincaid, owner, Greenock, homeport, and trade Liverpool–South Australia.

Baboo made two voyages to South Australia carrying immigrants. The first took her from Liverpool on 23 November 1839, to Port Adelaide, where she arrived on 9 March 1840. Emanuel Underwood, a passenger on board Baboo, brought with him a small vessel in frame, together with her equipment. He assembled her at Port Adelaide and named her  after the colony's governor.

On 14 May 1847, Baboo ran aground and was severely damaged in the River Thames at Limehouse, consequent to an argument as to whether she should be towed by tugs Lion or Newcastle. Baboo was on a voyage from London to Sydney. She was refloated and put back to London. She had here damages repaired that year.

On Baboos second voyage to South Australia, she left Deptford on 23 August 1848, and arrived at Port Adelaide on 4 December.

Royal Navy 
In March 1850, the Royal Navy purchased Baboo from Kincade. Wigrams of Blackwall fitted her for Arctic service at a cost of £8,520.

She joined Horatio Thomas Austin's 1850 attempt to find Sir John Franklin's ill-fated Northwest Passage expedition. Austin commanded , while Captain Erasmus Ommanney commanded Assistance. In the summer of 1850, Assistance anchored at Cape York in western Greenland, and took on an Inuit guide by the name of Qalasirssuaq.

Despite extensive search, the expedition failed to find conclusive evidence of the fate of Franklin and his men, and returned to Britain in 1851. They took their Inuit guide with them and he settled in England where he took the name Erasmus Augustine Kallihirua.

The Navy retained Assistance for future Arctic service, and in 1852 she sailed with Edward Belcher's expedition. She became trapped in ice off Bathurst Island, and was eventually abandoned there together with her steam tender HMS Pioneer on 25 August 1854.

Notes

Citations

References

External links 

 
 

 

1834 ships
Age of Sail merchant ships of England
Arctic exploration vessels
Exploration ships of the United Kingdom
British ships built in India
Migrant ships to Australia
Maritime incidents in May 1847
Maritime incidents in August 1854
Shipwrecks of the Canadian Arctic coast